The Bay View massacre (sometimes also referred to as the Bay View Tragedy) was the result of a strike held on May 4, 1886, by 7,000 building-trades workers and 5,000 Polish laborers who had organized at St. Stanislaus Catholic Church in Milwaukee, Wisconsin to strike against their employers, demanding the enforcement of an eight-hour work day. A few days earlier, on May 1, a peaceful demonstration had been held in nearby Chicago, with similar demands.

By Monday, May 3, the number of participants had increased to over 14,000 workers who gathered at the Milwaukee Iron Company rolling mill in Bay View. They were met by 250 National Guardsmen under order from Republican Governor Jeremiah M. Rusk. The strikers had shut down every business in the city except the North Chicago Rolling Mills in Bay View. The guardsmen's orders were that, if the strikers were to enter the Mills, they should shoot to kill. But when the captain received the order it had a different meaning: he ordered his men to pick out a man and shoot to kill when the order was given. Workers camped in the nearby fields and the Kosciuszko Militia arrived by May 4. Early the next day the crowd, which by this time contained children, approached the mill and were fired upon. Seven people died as a result, including a thirteen-year-old boy. Several more were injured during the protest. Several contradictory newspaper accounts described other possible casualties, but the count of seven deaths is substantiated by specific names (Frank Kunkel, Frank Nowarczyk, John Marsh, Robert Erdman, Johann Zazka, Martin Jankowiak, and Michael Ruchalski).

Since 1986, members of the Bay View Historical Society, the Wisconsin Labor History Society, and other community groups have held a commemorative event to honor the memories of those killed during the incident. The event is held every year on the first Sunday in May at 3pm, at the State Historical Marker site at the intersection of Superior Street and Russell Avenue, within view of the former rolling mill location.

See also

 Paul Grottkau
 Anti-union violence
 Bay View, Milwaukee
 Murder of workers in labor disputes in the United States
 List of incidents of civil unrest in the United States

References

External links
Wisconsin Labor History Society
"The 1886 Bay View Massacre" from the "People and Events in Labor History" collection on the Wisconsin Laborers' District Council website.

1886 riots
1886 in Wisconsin
1886 labor disputes and strikes
Massacres in 1886
History of Milwaukee
Labor disputes in the United States
Crime in Milwaukee
Protest-related deaths
Massacres in the United States
Labor-related violence in the United States
Labor disputes in Wisconsin
May 1886 events
Bay View, Milwaukee